Janne Westerlund (born 1973) is a Finnish musician, songwriter and visual artist known from such Finnish groups as Circle (with the band since 2001), Pharaoh Overlord, and . His main instrument is guitar but on his solo gigs he plays banjo as well. He sings and writes lyrics mainly in English. Westerlund's career started in the beginning of the 1990s in a small Finnish city called Hamina when he founded Sweetheart, an experimental noise rock group, with his friends. After Sweetheart, he released two albums of "organic electronica" with a trio called .

All the studio and live recordings with his past and present bands included, Westerlund has played on approximately 50 albums. In the autumn of 2012 he released his debut solo album named Oran.

Marshland, his second solo album, is released in January 2015 on Ektro Records.

Discography

Chainsmoker
 2001: Guarana Planet, CD (Bad Vugum)
 2003: Stations, CD (BV2 Produktions/Bad Vugum)

Circle

Pharaoh Overlord

Plain Ride
 2005: Oh the Flow, CD
 2007: Strange Trial, CD (Ektro Records)
 2009: House on the Hill, CD (Ektro Records)
 2011: Stonebridge, CD (Ektro Records)
 2014: Skeleton Kites, LP/CD (Ektro Records)

Solo career
 2012: Oran, CD
 2013: Kehittymättömät ufot, a soundtrack LP/CD for a comics book by Jyrki Nissinen
 2015: Marshland, LP/CD

Sweetheart
 1991: Mr. Cocktail / White-Eye, 7" (Bad Vugum)
 1992: Forestside / Rag Paradise, 7" (Bad Vugum)
 1992: Well-Dressed Meat, LP/CD (Bad Vugum)
 1993: Branchline / Diesel Engine, 7" (Bad Vugum)
 1994: An Ordinary Family Visits Hell, LP/CD (Bad Vugum)
 1996: Intoxicated Boom Boom, CD (Bad Vugum)
 1998: Stitches Removal Day, CD (Bad Vugum)

References

External links
 https://twitter.com/westerlundjanne
 https://soundcloud.com/jannewesterlund
 https://www.facebook.com/Westerlund.Janne/
 https://www.discogs.com/artist/333759-Janne-Westerlund

1973 births
Living people
Finnish male musicians